Badangarh is a village near Pilani in Jhunjhunu District, Rajasthan, state, India. It is bordered by Narhar to the east, Alampura to the west, Khudia to the south and Govali to the north.

The village of Badangarh is a part of Thikana Jhunjhunu. There is a famous temple of Sati Dadi near Shamshan Bhoomi of Badangarh. There is a Vishal temple of Balaji Maharaj in the Northern side of village. Younger generation of the village started a project namely "Green Project Badangarh 2017" and planted about 150 trees on both side of the road and playground of the village.  It has a Govt. Sr. Sec. school of co-education. The village has cultivated land around it. Most of the farmers are irrigating their lands using sprinklers.

References

Sources
 National Panchayat Directory

Villages in Jhunjhunu district